Sandra Valenti (27 November 1939 in Rome – 8 February 2005) was an Italian sprinter.

Biography
Sandra Valenti participated at one edition of the Summer Olympics (1960), she has 10 caps in national team from 1955 to 1960.

Achievements

See also
 Italy national relay team

References

External links
 

1939 births
2005 deaths
Italian female sprinters
Athletes (track and field) at the 1960 Summer Olympics
Athletes from Rome
Olympic athletes of Italy
Olympic female sprinters